Cedric G. Gyles (born c. 1928) is a former Canadian football player who played for the Calgary Stampeders. He won the Grey Cup with them in 1948. Gyles played junior football in Vancouver, British Columbia with the Junior Vancouver Blue Bombers. Gyles resides in Collingwood, Ontario and is the last surviving members of the 1948 Grey Cup championship team. An avid sailor, he is a long time member of the Royal Canadian Yacht Club in Toronto, Ontario. He served as Club Commodore in 1985-86. Gyles skippered the yacht Norseman to the Sira Cup at the 1999 8-Metre World Cup in Rochester, New York

References

1920s births
Canadian football running backs
Calgary Stampeders players
Living people